is a Japanese light novel series written by Masamune Kuji and illustrated by Hisasi. Riku Ayakawa is drawing a manga adaptation in Kadokawa's Comp Ace magazine. An anime television series aired from 5 July 2016 to 20 September 2016 and is licensed by Crunchyroll outside of Japan in the English-speaking regions.

Plot
The plot of the story occurs in the future when Earth is attacked by invaders from another universe through portals, and using weaponry that combines magic and science. Mankind's weapons are practically useless against the invaders. Mankind is forced to retreat from land and develops giant floating structures referred to as Mega Floats. A weapon referred to as Heart Hybrid Gear or HHG is developed, which is the only effective weapon against the invaders. A core is implanted within a person and by calling out the HHG's name, one can summon an armor around them which can effectively combat the Alternate Universe (AU) forces. 
Hida Kizuna possesses a HHG, but it is not strong enough to make him particularly important. His older sister calls him to transfer to a strategic defense school, where many of the students use their HHG abilities to fight invaders from another world while wearing extremely skimpy pilot outfits. Kizuna's fighting ability doesn't measure up, but his sister has another plan — performing erotic activities with Kizuna will allow the girls to replenish their energy or power-up. His ability proves to be critical to their success, as he and the other members of the Ataraxia defense academy find themselves engaged in a hidden agenda about the destruction of two worlds as well as to bring back his beloved from sorrow.

Characters

Ataraxia
Strategic Defense Academy Ataraxia is an academy for people who use Heart Hybrid Gear. It is also a Megafloat system cut off from mainland Japan. It was established in response to the arrival and mass onslaught of the Batlantis invasion force.

The central protagonist of the story. He was implanted with the first Heart Hybrid Gear (HHG) core as a child in an experiment conducted by his mother, the apparent creator of the HHG. However since men have a low compatibility with HHG, his armor has low offensive capabilities. His primary function is to Heart Hybrid with the female Amaterasu to restore their powers and achieve a Climax Hybrid so they can access their Immoral Weapons or Corruption Armament. Because of this ability, he is made captain of the Amaterasu, an elite team in Ataraxia. His HHG has the name 'Eros'. When it is seen that there are no men in Batlantis, it is confirmed that Kizuna is the only male HHG user.

One of the Amaterasu, she is a beautiful girl with long silver hair, red eyes and large bust. Her HHG is called 'Zeros' one of the 'Ros' series. Her Corruption Armament is called 'Pulverizer' a strange weapon that appears to be across between a sword and a cannon. She has no memory of her childhood, and is known by the Batlantis who believe that she is one of them. She is eventually revealed to be , the first daughter of the Batlantis Empire's emperor who is crowned Empress after her father's death at the age of 10.

One of the Amaterasu, she is a beautiful girl with long blonde hair, blue eyes and large bust. She was once the Ace of the American team of HHG users, 'Masters' before shifting to Ataraxia and becoming part of Amaterasu. Her HHG is called 'Kuros' another of the 'Ros' series. Her Corruption Armament is called "Crosshead" and is the only close range weapon of her HHG, having a range of only one meter, but its power is overwhelming.

One of the Amaterasu, she is a beautiful girl with black eyes. She has long black hair with red ribbons that keep her hair in twintails. She wears an academic uniform which is white and red. As a member of the morals committee, Hayuru has a very harsh and strict personality. She is very impatient and angers easily. Her HHG is called 'Neros'. Her weapon is a device that gives her 8 sharp bladed tools, that looks similar to a Japanese katana. Her Corruption Armament is a double bladed sword, almost 2 meters long called 'Gladius'.

The last and youngest member of the Amaterasu with short blonde hair and purple eyes. She usually wears her school uniform. She is a transfer student from Great Britain and Kizuna's direct subordinate. Kizuna installs the final 'Ros' series core, 'Taros' within her. Her Corruption Armament is called 'Titania' which allows her to project a small black hole for a short period. She can only use this once before becoming exhausted.

Older sister of Kizuna. She is the Principal and Commander of Ataraxia. She and Kizuna have the same black hair and eyes, and she is usually seen wearing a white uniform. Unlike Kizuna, she seems unemotional and has no affection for their mother. She dispassionately uses Kizuna to Heart Hybrid with the female Amaterasu. She later forms a secret romantic relationship with Kizuna, despite being related, and becomes pregnant with his child at the end of the series.

 Lab Director and Chief Engineer.

The engineering department's top student.

Kizuna and Reiri's Mother.

Masters
Masters are America's Heart Hybrid Gear team.

The Captain of the Masters, the HHG team of the West USA megafloat. Her HHG is called Ares, and produces a large number of missiles. In her first appearance she seems to hate Yurishia, because of an apparent betrayal, but Kizuna helps repair their relationship by showing what actually happened. She and Yurishia then perform Climax Hybrid with Kizuna, which allows him to use both their weapons at once. Her HHG has no Corruption Armament, but it becomes extremely powerful after Heart Hybrid.

A member of Masters, she is severely wounded during the Battle with Grabel and is confined to a wheelchair for a long period. She becomes the only HHG user when the rest get stuck in Batlantis.

Batlantis Empire
Batlantis is another world, that exists in another reality. They traverse to and fro between both Earth's dimension and their own, through a tear in the fabric of reality. Unlike Earth, there they have developed with both magic and science, which makes their technology many times more advanced and is the primary reason for the defeat humanity suffered.

Aine's younger sister and current Empress of the Batlantis Empire.

A soldier of the Batlantis Empire, she has tanned skin, short blonde hair and is extremely powerful. She is from another country conquered by Batlantis and is the first to discover 'Zeros' with Aine. She and Aldea have strong affections for each other. She also falls in love with Kizuna and becomes the first girl to become pregnant with his child, eventually giving birth to their daughter Kizuna. Her HHG has a corruption armament, Sword Gattling, which she can use in Batlantis without Heart Hybrid.

A soldier of Batlantis and partner of Grebel.

An elite soldier, who is a member of the Batlantis Empire's Royal Guard.

Captain of the Batlantis Empire's Royal Guard. She also falls in love with Kizuna and gives birth to their son whom she names Kizuna.

Media

Light novels
The light novels are written by Masamune Kuji and illustrated by Hisasi, with mecha designs by Kurogin. The series is published by Kadokawa's Kadokawa Sneaker Bunko imprint. The first volume was released in February 2014. The series ended with the thirteenth volume on 1 July 2018. A drama CD based on the series was released in March 2015, written by Kuji.

Manga
A manga adaptation with art by Riku Ayakawa began serialization in Kadokawa's Comp Ace on 26 June 2015. Yen Press has licensed the manga in North America.

Anime
In September 2015, an anime adaptation of Hybrid × Heart Magias Academy Ataraxia was announced. In January 2016, Kuji announced via Twitter that the adaptation would be a TV series, which is scheduled to premiere in July 2016. The main cast and staff were officially announced in April 2016. The series is directed by Hiroyuki Furukawa, written by Yasunori Yamada, and produced by Production IMS, with character designs by Kana Miyai. Masakatsu Ohmuro of Dax Production served as the sound director. The music of the series is produced by Victor Entertainment's Flying Dog label. Two pieces of theme music is used: an opening theme and an ending theme. The opening theme is "miele paradiso" ( "Honey Paradise"), and the ending song is "Chi"; both are performed by Iori Nomizu.

The series premiered on 5 July 2016, and was broadcast on AT-X, Tokyo MX, TV Saitama, Chiba TV, tvk, KBS Kyoto, Sun TV, and BS11 then ended on 20 September 2016. Crunchyroll simulcast the series on their website. An original video animation series, titled Love Room, was bundled in the first and second volume of the home video release, containing an episode each. The first and second home video release volumes were released on 30 September 2016 and 28 October 2016, respectively. In North America, Funimation, which is now known as Crunchyroll, licensed the series for a home media release on 21 November 2017. However, in October 2017, the home media release was delayed.

Explanatory notes

References

External links
  at Kadokawa Sneaker Bunko 
  at Comp Ace  
 
 

2014 Japanese novels
Action anime and manga
Anime and manga based on light novels
AT-X (TV network) original programming
Crunchyroll anime
Fantasy anime and manga
Funimation
Harem anime and manga
Kadokawa Sneaker Bunko
Kadokawa Shoten manga
Kadokawa Dwango franchises
Light novels
Production IMS
Seinen manga
Yen Press titles